In materials science, a general rule of mixtures is a weighted mean used to predict various properties of a composite material .  It provides a theoretical upper- and lower-bound on properties such as the elastic modulus, mass density, ultimate tensile strength, thermal conductivity, and electrical conductivity. In general there are two models, one for axial loading (Voigt model), and one for transverse loading (Reuss model).

In general, for some material property  (often the elastic modulus), the rule of mixtures states that the overall property in the direction parallel to the fibers may be as high as

where
  is the volume fraction of the fibers
  is the material property of the fibers
  is the material property of the matrix
It is a common mistake to believe that this is the upper-bound modulus for Young's modulus. The real upper-bound Young's modulus is larger than  given by this formula. Even if both constituents are isotropic, the real upper bound is  plus a term in the order of square of the difference of the Poisson's ratios of the two constituents.

The inverse rule of mixtures states that in the direction perpendicular to the fibers, the elastic modulus of a composite can be as low as

If the property under study is the elastic modulus, this quantity is called the lower-bound modulus, and corresponds to a transverse loading.

Derivation for elastic modulus

Upper-bound modulus 

Consider a composite material under uniaxial tension .  If the material is to stay intact, the strain of the fibers,  must equal the strain of the matrix, .  Hooke's law for uniaxial tension hence gives

Noting stress to be a force per unit area, a force balance gives that

If it is assumed that the composite material behaves as a linear-elastic material, i.e., abiding Hooke's law  for some elastic modulus of the composite  and some strain of the composite , then equations  and  can be combined to give

Finally, since , the overall elastic modulus of the composite can be expressed as

Lower-bound modulus 

Now let the composite material be loaded perpendicular to the fibers, assuming that .  The overall strain in the composite is distributed between the materials such that

The overall modulus in the material is then given by

since , .

Other properties 

Similar derivations give the rules of mixtures for

 mass density:
 ultimate tensile strength:
 thermal conductivity:
 electrical conductivity:

See also 
When considering the empirical correlation of some physical properties and the chemical composition of compounds, other relationships, rules, or laws, also closely resembles the rule of mixtures: 
 Amagat's law – Law of partial volumes of gases
 Gladstone–Dale equation – Optical analysis of liquids, glasses and crystals
 Kopp's law – Uses mass fraction
 Kopp–Neumann law – Specific heat for alloys 
 Vegard's law – Crystal lattice parameters

References

External links 
Rule of mixtures calculator

Materials science
Laws of thermodynamics